Achnatherum aridum is a species of grass known by the common name Mormon needlegrass. It is native to the southwestern United States from the Mojave Desert in California east to Colorado and New Mexico.

Description
Achnatherum aridum is a resident of high desert scrub and woodland habitat at some elevation. It is a tuft-forming perennial bunchgrass without rhizomes. The inflorescence is a panicle often partly enfolded in the narrow sheath of the uppermost leaf.

References

External links
Jepson Manual Treatment - Achnatherum aridum
USDA Plants Profile; Achnatherum aridum
Achnatherum aridum - Photo gallery

aridum
Bunchgrasses of North America
Grasses of Mexico
Grasses of the United States
Native grasses of California
Flora of the California desert regions
Flora of the Southwestern United States
Flora of New Mexico
Flora of Arizona
Flora of Colorado
Flora of Utah
Natural history of the Mojave Desert
Plants described in 1895
Flora without expected TNC conservation status